The CPF number (Portuguese for "Natural Persons Register") is the Brazilian individual taxpayer registry, since its creation in 1965. This number is attributed by the Brazilian Federal Revenue to Brazilians and resident aliens who, directly or indirectly, pay taxes in Brazil. It's an 11-digit number in the format 000.000.000-00, where the last 2 numbers are check digits, generated through an arithmetic operation on the first nine digits. 

In May 2020, a digital version of the document was promoted for Android and iOS. 

In June 2020, an audit from the Tribunal de Contas da União (Federal Court of Accounts, often referred to as TCU) revealed that there was at least 12.5 million CPFs more than the total population.

During COVID-19 pandemic the Revenue reported 223.8 million active CPFs, the problem is that, according to the Brazilian Institute of Geography and Statistics (IBGE), the Brazilian population at the time of the survey was around 211.4 million people, updated to 211.8 million at the end of August.

Auditors revealed that there was evidence that an individual was already dead in 3.3 million valid entries and more than 78.000 active CPFs of people over 110 years old. International surveys show that there are only 29 people in this age group in the world – and only one lives in Brazil.

During the COVID-19 pandemic, all requests for CPF from new foreign residents are being taken virtually.  

Foreign residents can request a CPF online or at an embassy or consulate, when available. The online form is available in Spanish and English.

In November 2021, Santa Catarina launched a unified document, with CPF and RG (Identity Card) integrating a single 11-digit number, authorities say the initiative will reduce fraud, but the change is not mandatory.

Mandatory registration 
People required to register a CPF number are individuals who:

 Reside in Brazil and are part of the passive pole of the main or ancillary tax relationship, whether as a taxpayer or responsible person, as well as the respective legal representatives;
 Carry out real estate operations of any kind in Brazil;
 Have, in Brazil, bank, savings or investment accounts, or operate in the financial or capital market in the country;
 Operate in the financial or capital market in Brazil, including stock, commodities, futures and similar exchanges;
 Possess, in Brazil, assets and rights subject to public registration or specific registration, including real estate, vehicles, vessels, aircraft, financial instruments and equity interests or in the capital market;
 Are declared as dependents in the IRPF Declaration (Personal Income Tax);
 As required by agencies or entities of the federal, state, district or municipal public administration, under the terms of its own legislation, it affects the business of these agencies and entities;
 Had their birth registered in a Brazilian civil registry office after the execution of the agreement between the Brazilian Federal Revenue Service and the Brazilian Association of Registrars of Natural Persons (ARPEN); or
 Have applied for benefits of any kind in the INSS (National Institute of Social Security).

As a general-purpose identification number 
On 11 January 2023, a federal law has been enacted in Brazil to consider the CPF number "unique and sufficient" to identify citizens on government databases. The law also requires the CPF number to appear on databases and documents of government entities, the civil registry of natural persons and professional councils, especially the following documents:
 birth, marriage and death certificates;
 National Identity Document (Documento Nacional de Identidade or DNI);
 Worker Identification Number (Número de Identificação do Trabalhador or NIT);
 registration with the Social Integration Program (Programa de Integração Social or PIS) or the Public Servant Patrimony Formation Program (Programa de Formação de Patrimônio do Servidor Público or PASEP)
 National Health Card (Cartão Nacional de Saúde);
 voter registration;
 work cards;
 driver's license numbers;
 military certificates;
 professional identity cards issued by fiscalization councils of regulated professions, and;
 other registration certificates and registration numbers on government databases.

The law also specifies that all new identity documents issued or re-issued by government entities or professional councils must use the CPF number as the identification number. The law is effective as soon as it is published, and government entities have 12 months from the publication of the law to adopt the CPF number as the identification number on their systems and procedures, and 24 months for entities to accomplish interoperability between databases through the CPF number.

Characteristics 

A CPF number is a 11-digit number of which the first eight digits form its base. The ninth number indicates the Fiscal Region responsible for its registration. The Fiscal Regions have the following identification:

 1 – DF, GO, MS, MT and TO;
 2 – AC, AM, AP, PA, RO and RR;
 3 – CE, MA and PI;
 4 – AL, PB, PE and RN;
 5 – BA and SE;
 6 – MG;
 7 – ES and RJ;
 8 – SP;
 9 – PR and SC;
 10 – RS.

In regards of the tenth Fiscal Region, the number zero is used as the ninth digit.

Finally, the last two digits are the verifying digits, mathematically calculated.

See also 
 CNPJ – National Registry of Legal Entities
 National identification number (section Brazil)
 Brazilian identity card
 Social Security number (a similar code in the USA)
 National Insurance number (a similar number in the United Kingdom)
 SNILS (a similar number in Russia)
 Social insurance number (a similar number in Canada)
 INSEE code (a similar number in France)
 PPSN (a similar number in Ireland)
 Tax file number (a similar number in Australia)
 Aadhaar (a similar number in India)
 Identity document

References

External links
  Receita Federal – Cadastro de Pessoas Físicas – CPF – Federal Revenue site, CPF issuing page.
  Gerador e Validador de CPFs para desenvolvedores de sites – CPF generator for webpage development.
  Gerador de CPF para fins de validação e testes – CPF generator for test and validation.
 CPF Algorithm in Perl
 Itamaraty – Diplomatic Mission Representation – MRE – Ministry of Foreign Affairs, list of Embassies and Consulates.
 MRE – Diplomatic Mission Representation – Consulate General of Brazil, list of Embassies and Consulates.
  Gerador de CPF – CPF generator to help programmers and analysts 

Taxpayer identification numbers
Identity documents
Government of Brazil
Taxation in Brazil